The Kap Jungersen Formation is a geologic formation in Greenland. It preserves fossils dating back to the Carboniferous period.

See also

 List of fossiliferous stratigraphic units in Greenland

References
 

Carboniferous Greenland